Franklin Juan Herrera Gómez(born April 14, 1988) is a Bolivian football midfielder, who most recently played for Oruro Royal.

References

External links
Ficha en Cero a Cero 

1988 births
Living people
People from Oruro, Bolivia
Association football midfielders
Bolivian footballers
Club San José players